The Vigilant-class gunvessel of the Royal Navy was an enlarged version of the Arrow-class gunvessel of 1854. Both classes were designed for shallow-water operations in the Baltic and Black Seas during the Crimean War. Fourteen of the class were completed, but were ready too late to take part in that conflict.  Cormorant was sunk in action at the Taku Forts, Osprey was wrecked on the coast of Africa in 1867 and the rest were all sold during the 1860s, with Sparrowhawk lasting until 1872.

Design
The class were designed as second-class despatch and gunvessels.  They were intended to operate close inshore during the Crimean War and were essentially enlarged versions of the Arrow-class gunvessel, which has been designed by the Surveyor’s Department in 1854.

Propulsion

Sail plan
All Vigilant-class gunvessels were barque-rigged.

Armament
Although designed with a pair of 68-pounder Lancaster muzzle-loading rifles, the Vigilant class were finished with one / Armstrong breech-loading gun, one  Lancaster muzzle-loading rifled gun and two 20-pounder breech loaders.

Ships

References

Gunboat classes
 
 Vigilant